The men's double trap team competition at the 2010 Asian Games in Guangzhou, China was held on 21 November at the Guangzhou Shotgun Centre.

Schedule
All times are China Standard Time (UTC+08:00)

Records

Results

References

ISSF Results Overview

External links
Official website

Men Shotgun DT T